Molloy is a novel by Samuel Beckett first written in French and published by Paris-based Les Éditions de Minuit in 1951. The English translation, published in 1955, is by Beckett and Patrick Bowles.

As part of the Trilogy
Molloy is the first of three novels initially written in Paris between 1947 and 1950; this trio, which includes Malone Dies and The Unnamable, is collectively referred to as ‘The Trilogy’ or ‘the Beckett Trilogy.’ Beckett wrote all three books in French and then, aside from some collaborative work on Molloy with Patrick Bowles, served entirely as his own English-language translator; he did the same for most of his plays. As Paul Auster explains, “Beckett’s renderings of his own work are never literal, word-by-word transcriptions. They are free, highly-inventive adaptations of the original text—or, perhaps more accurately, ‘repatriations’ from one language to the other, from one culture to the other. In effect, he wrote every book twice, and each version bears its own indelible mark.” The three thematically-related books are dark existentialist comedies “whose ostensible subject is death,” but, as Salman Rushdie asserts, “are in fact books about life, the lifelong battle of life against its shadow, life shown near battle’s end, bearing its lifetime of scars.”  As the books progress, the prose becomes increasingly bare and stripped down, and as Benjamin Kunkel notes, they “[have] become famous in the history of fiction because of what is left out: the usual novelistic apparatus of plot, scenes, and characters. … Here, it seems, is the novelistic equivalent of abstract painting.”

Plot summary
On first appearance the book concerns two different characters, both of whom have interior monologues in the book. As the story moves along the two characters are distinguished by name only as their experiences and thoughts are similar. The novel is set in an indeterminate place, most often identified with the Ireland of Beckett's birth.

The majority of Part One is made up of Molloy's inner musings interspersed with the action of the plot. It is split into two paragraphs: the first is less than two pages long; the second paragraph lasts for over eighty pages. In the first we are given a vague idea of the setting Molloy is writing in. We are told that he now lives in his mother's room, though how he arrived there or whether his mother died before or during his stay is apparently forgotten. There is also a man who arrives every Sunday to pick up what Molloy has written and bring back what he had taken last week returning them "marked with signs" though Molloy never cares to read them. He describes that his purpose while writing is to "speak of the things that are left, say [his] goodbyes, finish dying." In the second paragraph he describes a journey he had taken some time earlier, before he came there, to find his mother. He spends much of it on his bicycle, gets arrested for resting on it in a way that is considered lewd, but is unceremoniously released. From town to anonymous town and across anonymous countryside, he encounters a succession of bizarre characters: an elderly man with a stick; a policeman; a charity worker; a woman whose dog he kills running over it with a bike (her name is never completely determined: "a Mrs Loy... or Lousse, I forget, Christian name something like Sophie"), and one whom he falls in love with ("Ruth" or maybe "Edith");  He abandons his bicycle (which he will not call "bike"), walks in no certain direction, meeting "a young old man"; a charcoal-burner living in the woods, whom he attacks and savagely beats.

Part Two is narrated by a private detective by the name of Jacques Moran, who is given the task by his boss, the mysterious Youdi, of tracking down Molloy. This narrative (Part Two) begins: It is midnight. The rain is beating on the windows. He sets out, taking his recalcitrant son, also named Jacques, with him. They wander across the countryside, increasingly bogged down by the weather, decreasing supplies of food and Moran's suddenly failing body. He sends his son to purchase a bicycle and while his son is gone, Moran encounters two strange men, one of whom Moran murders (in manner comparable to Molloy's), and then hides his body in the forest. Eventually, the son disappears, and he struggles home. At this point in the work, Moran begins to pose several odd theological questions, which make him appear to be going mad. Having returned to his home, now in a state of shambles and disuse, Moran switches to discussing his present state. He has begun to use crutches, just as Molloy does at the beginning of the novel. Also a voice, which has appeared intermittently throughout his part of the text, has begun to significantly inform his actions. The novel ends with Moran explaining that the voice told him "to write the report."  Then I went back into the house and wrote, It is midnight. The rain is beating on the windows. It was not midnight. It was not raining. Thus, Moran forsakes reality, beginning to descend into the command of this "voice" which may in fact mark the true creation of Molloy. Due to the succession of the book from the first part to the second, the reader is led to believe that time is passing in a similar fashion; however, the second part could be read as a prequel to the first.

Characters in Molloy
 Molloy is a vagrant, currently bedridden; it appears he is a seasoned veteran in vagrancy, reflecting that "To him who has nothing it is forbidden not to relish filth." He is surprisingly well-educated, having studied geography and anthropology, among other things, and seems to know something of "old Geulincx" (the 17th-century post-Cartesian occasionalist philosopher). He has a number of bizarre habits, not least of which is the sucking of pebbles, described by Beckett in a long and detailed passage, and also having an odd and rather morbid attachment to his mother (who may or may not be dead).
 Moran is a private detective, with a housekeeper, Martha, and son, Jacques, both of whom he treats with scorn. He is pedantic and extremely ordered, pursuing the task set him logically, to the point of absurdity, expressing fear that his son will catch him masturbating and being an extreme disciplinarian. He also shows an insincere reverence for the church and deference to the local priest. As the novel progresses, his body begins to fail for no visible or specified reason, a fact that surprises him, and his mind begins to decline to the point of insanity. This similarity in bodily and mental decline leads readers to believe that Molloy and Moran are in fact two facets of the same personality, or that the section narrated by Molloy is actually written by Moran.
 Molloy's Mother Though never seen alive, Molloy's Mother is mentioned at various points in the chapter; her house being both the destination of the journey he describes as well as his residence while writing it. Molloy refers to her as Mag as "the letter g abolished the syllable Ma, and as it were spat on it, better than any other letter would have done." He communicates with her using a knocking method (as she is apparently both deaf and blind)  where he hits her on the head with the knuckle of his index finger: "One knock meant yes, two no, three I don't know, four money, five goodbye." At times this seems more of an excuse to be violent towards her; when asking for money he would replace the knocks with "one or more (according to my needs) thumps of the fist, on her skull." He seems to hold extreme contempt for his mother both for her condition and for the fact she failed to kill him during her pregnancy.

Literary significance and legacy
The Trilogy is generally considered to be one of the most important literary works of the 20th century, and the most important non-dramatic work in Beckett's oeuvre.

Novelist Tim Parks, writing in The Telegraph, described its influence on him: "Molloy entirely changed my sense of what could be done with literature. You have a wonderfully engaging, comic voice remembering distant events in the narrator's life – an attempt to find his mother to ask her for money – yet as you read, every ordinary assumption one has about novels is stripped away from you, the setting, the identity of the characters, the time scheme, the reality of events themselves. In the end, nothing is certain but that the voice will go on trying to put a life together and make sense of it until death calls time on the tale."

Comparing Molloy with the novels that preceded it, The New York Times wrote that the experience was "to marvel anew at the velocity and drive of the prose. The energy is suddenly urgent and channeled into an exploration of an inner landscape, a passionate and obsessive investigation of being."

In an interview, Brian Evenson said "I tend to think contemporary American fiction would be more interesting if more writers knew Molloy."

Vladimir Nabokov considered it one of his favorite of Beckett's books.

Passages from the novel are spoken by a possessed character in Annihilation (film), directed by Alex Garland and based on the Southern Reach Trilogy by Jeff VanderMeer.

Allusions/references to other works
Molloy includes references to a number of Beckett's other works, especially the characters, who are revealed as fictional characters in the same manner as Molloy and Moran: "Oh the stories I could tell you if I were easy. What a rabble in my head, what a gallery of moribunds. Murphy, Watt, Yerk, Mercier and all the others." (Part II)

Imagery from Dante is present throughout the novel, as in much of Beckett's work. In Part I, Molloy compares himself to Belacqua from the Purgatorio, Canto IV and Sordello from the Purgatorio, Canto VI. There are also Molloy's frequent references to the various positions of the sun, which calls to mind similar passages in the Purgatorio. Belacqua is also the name of the central character in Beckett's More Pricks Than Kicks.

Publication details
 French original: Paris: Éditions de Minuit, 1951
 English: 1955, Paris: Olympia Press, paperback; NY: Grove Press
 Included in Three Novels. NY: Grove Press, 1959
 In The Grove Centenary Edition, Vol. II: Novels. NY: Grove Press, 2006

BBC broadcast
A reading of selected passages from Part 1 of Molloy was broadcast on the BBC Third Programme on 10 December 1957, and repeated on 13 December. Beckett selected the passages, which were read by the actor Patrick Magee, and incidental music, performed by the Philip Jones Brass Ensemble, was composed by Samuel's cousin John S. Beckett. The producer was Donald McWhinnie.

Unabridged audiobook
Individual unabridged audiobooks of the entire Beckett Trilogy were released by Naxos Audiobooks between 2003-2005. Molloy (2003) is read by actors Dermot Crowley and Sean Barrett, who each deliver one of the book’s two monologues. Malone Dies (2004) and The Unnamable (2005) are read by Sean Barrett. The production of Molloy has been praised for its accessibility: "The distinct readings lend the book a dramatic presence, playfully yet skillfully rendering all the characters to illuminate Beckett's irony. So while in print it seems dark, even absurd, in audio this work takes on the full richness of comedy, probably as Beckett, preeminently a dramatist, intended."

See also
 Depersonalization

References

External links
 Samuel Beckett Endpage
 Samuel Beckett Resources and Links

1951 French novels
French-language novels
Novels by Samuel Beckett
Postmodern novels

sv:Samuel Beckett#Prosa